Badiya Ka Bala is a village in Ajmer tehsil of Ajmer district of Rajasthan state in India. The village falls under Miyapur gram panchayat.

Demography
As per 2011 census of India, Badiya Ka Bala has population of 305 of which 159 are males and 146 are females. Sex ratio of the village is 918.

Transportation
Badiya Ka Bala is connected by air (Kishangarh Airport), by train (Ajmer Junction railway station) and by road.

See also
Ajmer Tehsil

References

Villages in Ajmer district